Lucida Grande is a humanist sans-serif typeface. It is a member of the Lucida family of typefaces designed by Charles Bigelow and Kris Holmes. It is best known for its implementation throughout the macOS user interface from 1999 to 2014, as well as in other Apple software like Safari for Windows. As of OS X Yosemite (version 10.10), the system font was changed from Lucida Grande to Helvetica Neue. In OS X El Capitan (version 10.11) the system font changed again, this time to San Francisco.

The typeface looks very similar to Lucida Sans and Lucida Sans Unicode. Like Sans Unicode, Grande supports the most commonly used characters defined in version 2.0 of the Unicode standard.

Three weights of Lucida Grande: Normal, Bold, and Black, in three styles: Roman, Italic, and Oblique, were developed by Bigelow & Holmes. Apple released the Regular (Normal Roman) and Bold Roman with OS X.

In June, 2014, Bigelow & Holmes released four weights: Light, Normal, Bold, and Black, in three styles: Roman, Italic, and Oblique. B&H also released Narrow versions of those twelve weight/styles, plus four Lucida Grande Monospaced fonts in Regular, Bold, Italic, and Bold Italic styles, with narrow versions of the four monospaced weight/styles.

Lucida Grande fonts directly from Bigelow & Holmes contain the pan-European WGL character set.

Scripts and Unicode ranges
Lucida Grande contains 2,826 Unicode-encoded glyphs (2,245 characters) in version 5.0d8e1 (Revision 1.002).

Language support by version:

Similarity to Lucida Sans/Lucida Sans Unicode
Almost all glyphs in Lucida Grande (and Lucida Grande Bold) look identical to their matching counterparts in Lucida Sans (and Lucida Sans Demibold) as well as Lucida Sans Unicode, with the very few exceptions of:
 The digit "1" with a serif on the baseline;
 The hyphen "-" that is longer, roughly of an en-dash width;
 The commercial at "@" with a larger and more upright letter and circle.
These slightly different characters look clearer in small font sizes in display and user interface (especially graphical and web-based) uses.

Note: If you have installed Lucida Grande font on Windows or Linux you will see followings above.

Uses
Apart from macOS releases prior to OS X Yosemite, many websites and blogs use Lucida Grande as the default typeface for body text, for example Facebook and many phpBB forums. Since this typeface is usually absent from most other operating systems like Windows and Linux, the CSS style sheets of these websites often include the fonts (usually Sans-serif: Tahoma, Verdana, Trebuchet MS, Segoe UI, Calibri, DejaVu Sans, Arial, Open Sans, or even Lucida Sans Unicode, in case Lucida Grande is unavailable for rendering. After the introduction of OS X Yosemite where Lucida Grande is no longer used as the default system font, several developers have created utilities to bring Lucida Grande back as the default system font.

Although it was designed primarily as a screen font, Lucida Grande/Sans also appears frequently in print, due at least in part to the ubiquity of Mac platform (and thus the typeface) in professional-grade desktop publishing. The Getty-Dubay Italic Handwriting Series of penmanship workbooks in particular is typeset primarily in a specially modified version of Lucida Sans (with a cursive lowercase "y"), as its monoline italic bears a close resemblance to the form of writing that the program teaches.

See also
Lucida Sans Unicode
List of typefaces included with macOS
Unicode fonts
Sans-serif

References

External links
 Lucida Grande Text Samples – Light, Normal, Bold, Black
 Lucida Grande Mono Text Samples – Normal, Bold

Humanist sans-serif typefaces
Unicode typefaces
Apple Inc. typefaces
Typefaces designed by Charles Bigelow (type designer)
Typefaces designed by Kris Holmes